Al's Lads (released in the United States as Capone's Boys) is a 2002 British crime drama film directed by Richard Standeven and starring Marc Warren, Ralf Little and Al Sapienza.

Plot
Three British Scouser merchant sailors working as waiters on a transatlantic liner in 1927 are given a chance to work for the Al Capone gang, after running booze (bootlegging) into the US during Prohibition.

Cast
Marc Warren as Jimmy
Kirsty Mitchell as Edith
Peter Pedrero as Brendan
Al Sapienza as Georgio
Ralf Little as Dan
Julian Littman as Al Capone
Scott Maslen as Sammy
Stephen Lord as Eddy
Richard Roundtree as Boom Boom
Warwick Davis as Leo
Ricky Tomlinson as Billy

References

External links
 

2002 films
British crime drama films
2002 drama films
2000s English-language films
2000s British films